Joseph Gangemi is a screenwriter and novelist. Born in Wilmington, Delaware, he graduated from Swarthmore College in 1992. He lives outside Philadelphia with his wife and young children.

Bibliography

Film

 Wind Chill (2007, with Steven A. Katz)
 Stonehearst Asylum (2014)
 Go with Me (2015, with Gregory Jacobs)

Television

 Spirit Box (2009, NBC TV anthology series Fear Itself)
 Red Oaks (2014-, Amazon Original TV series, Co-Creator / Executive Producer)

Novels

Inamorata (2004)

References

External links

Writers from Wilmington, Delaware
Living people
Swarthmore College alumni
American male screenwriters
20th-century American novelists
21st-century American novelists
American male novelists
20th-century American male writers
21st-century American male writers
Screenwriters from Delaware
Year of birth missing (living people)